Tinchy Stryder vs. Maniac is a collaborative studio album by recording artist Tinchy Stryder and grime record producer Maniac. The album produced one single, "Rollin Remix", and is most noted for bringing Maniac's productions to a wider audience.

Track listing

Personnel 
Credits for Eskibeat Recordings Presents: Tinchy Stryder vs. Maniac.
 Brandon "Maniac" Jolie – Record executive, producer, arrange, mixing, music and instrumentation
 Kwasi "Tinchy Stryder" Danquah III – Lyrics, music and vocals

References

External links
Tinchy Stryder Vs. Maniac At Amazon.com
Tinchy Stryder Vs. Maniac At Discogs

2008 albums
Tinchy Stryder albums
Maniac (producer) albums